My Love (also known as Love, First) is a 2007 South Korean film.

Plot 
Three couples and one single man experience the miracle of love during the Christmas season. Joo-won, who is prone to daydreams and flights of fancy, shares a loving relationship with her subway driver boyfriend Se-jin. College student So-hyeon falls in love with fellow student Ji-woo, and asks him for drinking lessons despite her inability to handle alcohol. Career woman Soo-jeong is attracted to widowed father Jeong-seok, though he continually rejects her advances. And oddball "free hug activist" Jin-man returns to Seoul hoping to meet his old girlfriend.

Cast 
 Kam Woo-sung ... Se-jin
 Choi Kang-hee ... Joo-won
 Uhm Tae-woong ... Jin-man
 Jung Il-woo ... Ji-woo
 Lee Yeon-hee ... So-hyeon
 Ryu Seung-ryong ... Jeong-seok
 Im Jung-eun ... Soo-jeong
 Choi Jong-ryul ... Traveler
 Seo Shin-ae ... Hye-yeong
 Park Chang-ik ... Ba-da
 Lee Jong-goo ... Se-jin's superior
 Jo Moon-ee ... Se-jin's co-worker
 Park Ji-ho ... Blind date man
 Shin So-yul ... Reporter
 Lee Han-wi (cameo)

Release 
My Love was released in South Korea on December 18, 2007, and on its opening weekend was ranked fifth at the box office with 182,097 admissions.

References

External links 
 
 
 

2007 films
2000s Korean-language films
South Korean romantic drama films
Showbox films
Films directed by Lee Han
2000s South Korean films